Elections to Colchester Borough Council were held in 1976 alongside other local elections across the country. The whole council was up for election on new ward boundaries.

Results summary

Ward results

Berechurch

Birch-Messing

Boxted & Langham

Castle

Copford & Eight Ash Green

Dedham

East Donyland

Fordham

Great & Little Horkesley

Great Tey

Harbour

Lexden

Marks Tey

Mile End

New Town

Prettygate

Pyefleet

Shrub End

St. Andrew's

St. Anne's

St. John's

St. Mary's

Stanway

Tiptree

West Bergholt

West Mersea

Winstree

Wivenhoe

References

1976
1976 English local elections
1970s in Essex